William Deedes may refer to:

William Deedes senior (1796–1862), English cricketer for Kent, Member of Parliament (MP) for East Kent 1845–1857 and 1857–1862
William Deedes junior (1834–1887), English cricketer for Gentlemen of Kent, MP for East Kent 1876–1880
Bill Deedes, British journalist and Conservative MP for Ashford 1950–1974